The Franciscan Cup is an annual men's basketball contest played between two of the four NCAA Division-I Association of Franciscan Colleges and Universities member schools.

The annual non-conference men's basketball game allows the winner between Siena and St. Bonaventure to retain the Franciscan Cup until the following year's game.

Prior to the creation of the Franciscan Cup, the two teams had played semi-regularly with St. Bonaventure leading the series with a 25–7 record.  The first ever meeting occurred during the 1939–1940 season with St. Bonaventure earning a 51–43 victory.

Cup History

Note: Due to Covid-19 there was no game played in the 2019-20 season.

References

College basketball rivalries in the United States
Siena Saints men's basketball
St. Bonaventure Bonnies men's basketball